The Saskatchewan Rush are a lacrosse team based in Saskatoon, Saskatchewan playing in the National Lacrosse League (NLL). The 2019 season is the 14th in franchise history, 4th in Saskatchewan.

Current standings

Game log

Regular season
Reference:

Playoffs

Current roster

See also
2019 NLL season

References

Saskatchewan Rush
Saskatchewan Rush seasons
Saskatchewan Rush